Compassion International is an American child sponsorship and Christian humanitarian aid organization headquartered in Colorado Springs, Colorado, that aims to positively influence the long-term development of children globally who live in poverty.

Preliminary independent, secular research in the Journal of Political Economy studied the organization, concluding that it had large and statistically significant impacts on participants' years of school completion, the probability of later employment, and the quality of that employment, in part as a consequence of improved self-esteem and expectations in participating children.

History
The Everett Swanson Evangelistic Association was founded in 1952 by the Rev. Everett Swanson (member of  Converge) to help children orphaned by war in South Korea. Swanson had traveled there to preach the gospel to the US Army troops, but during his visit he was deeply moved by the plight of the scores of abandoned children he saw. In 1953, he began to raise funds, and the next year he developed sponsorship programs to help support orphans for a few dollars a month. The name of the association changed to Compassion, Inc., in 1963, inspired by Jesus' words "I have compassion on the multitude. I will not send them away hungry" (Matthew 15.32). In 2022, it would be present in 27 countries.

Leadership
As of November 2019, the board chair of the organization was Judy Golz, and the president and CEO was Santiago Mellado.

Programs
Compassion helps those in impoverished areas, using a holistic approach to child development. This approach goes well beyond simply providing food and medical aid, involving education and training to prepare the individuals for contributing back to their communities.

The organization also helps in emergency situations and in the funding of health centers.

Child sponsorship
Children in the child sponsorship program are provided food and clean water, medical care, education, life-skills training, and spiritual guidance through a direct sponsorship. Sponsored children are selected by the sponsors from lists provided by the ministry, and two-way communication is encouraged between the sponsored child and the sponsor.  the cost to sponsor a child through Compassion was US$38 per month, and globally there were over two million babies, children, and young adults in its programs.

Sponsors are able to visit their sponsored children through trips planned by Compassion International. Compassion's goal is to provide a trip to each country every other year. Compassion coordinates every aspect of the trip, including travel, meals, tips and gratuities, fees related to the travel, and sightseeing fares.

Evaluations
Compassion International is a charter member of the Evangelical Council for Financial Accountability in the US, holds a grade of "A" from CharityWatch, and has met the "20 Standards for Charity Accountability" from the Better Business Bureau's Wise Giving Alliance.

In 2013, a primary research report in the Journal of Political Economy provided evidence in support of the conclusion that child sponsorship via Compassion International resulted in significant positive outcomes for the children in the study set. The research, by Bruce Wydick, Paul Glewwe, and Laine Rutledge, evaluated Compassion efforts in six countries, with 10,144 children studied, reporting "large, statistically significant impacts on years of schooling; primary, secondary, and tertiary school completion; and the probability and quality of employment." They went on to note that the evidence, while early, "suggest[ed] that these impacts are due, in part, to increases in children’s aspirations."

Through 2015, Compassion International had received Charity Navigator's highest rating for 15 consecutive years, thereby receiving special recognition on their "10 Charities with the Most Consecutive 4-Star Ratings" list. However, Charity Navigator changed its rating system in 2016, and Compassion International's 2016 overall rating dropped to three stars out of four, for its accountability and transparency.

In 2016, Compassion was ranked the 15th-largest charity organization in the US by Forbes magazine, with $799 million in private donations received.

Shutdown in India
Compassion operated in India for 48 years, with $45 million in transfers annually, making it India's largest single foreign donor. Compassion provided services under its Child Sponsor Program to 145,000 Indian children. In 2015, Compassion affiliates' offices were raided by tax investigators seeking evidence on whether it was funding religious conversions. Compassion said that attempts were made to force the ministry to divert funding to non-Christian Rashtriya Swayamsevak Sangh groups. Compassion refused to do so as it would be a misuse of funds entrusted to them by donors all around the world. After talks back and forth, in 2017 the BJP-led Indian government barred Compassion from transferring funds into India, forcing the group to close its operations in that country. The Ministry of External Affairs later stated that the ban had nothing to do with the ideology of Compassion International.

References

External links
 
 
 
 
 
 
 
 
 
 
 
 
 
 
 

1952 establishments in the United States
Charities based in Colorado
Children's charities based in the United States
Christian charities based in the United States
Evangelical Christian humanitarian organizations
Evangelicalism in Colorado
Organizations based in Colorado Springs, Colorado
Religion in Colorado Springs, Colorado
Christian organizations established in 1952